Hemiolaus caeculus, the azure hairstreak, is a butterfly of the family Lycaenidae. It is found in East and southern Africa.

The wingspan is 30–35 mm for males and 34–38 mm for females. Adults are on wing year round with peaks after rains.

The larvae feed on Olax species, including Olax dissitiflora and Olax obtusifolia.

Subspecies

Hemiolaus caeculus caeculus — Cape, KwaZulu-Natal, Transvaal, Mozambique, Zimbabwe, Malawi, eastern Zambia, south-eastern Tanzania
Hemiolaus caeculus littoralis Stempffer, 1954 — coast of eastern Kenya and eastern Tanzania, Usambara Mountains
Hemiolaus caeculus vividus Pinhey, 1962 — western Zambia, south-western Tanzania, southern Zaire (south-eastern Shaba)
Hemiolaus caeculus tsodiloensis (Pinhey, 1969) — northern Botswana

References

External links
Die Großschmetterlinge der Erde 13: Die afrikanischen Tagfalter. Plate XIII 67 b also (synonym) as dolores Suffert, 1904

Butterflies described in 1855
Hypolycaenini